Thomas Mackworth was an English politician.

Thomas Mackworth may also refer to:

Sir Thomas Mackworth, 1st Baronet (died 1626), of the Mackworth baronets
Sir Thomas Mackworth, 3rd Baronet (1624–1694), of the Mackworth baronets, MP for Rutland (UK Parliament constituency) 
Sir Thomas Mackworth, 4th Baronet (died 1745), of the Mackworth baronets, MP for Rutland
Sir Thomas Mackworth, 5th Baronet (died 1769), of the Mackworth baronets